Lebanese Melkite Christians are the adherents of the Melkite Greek Catholic Church in Lebanon, which is the third largest Christian group in the country after the Maronite Church and the Greek Orthodox Church of Antioch.

The Lebanese Melkite Christians are believed to constitute about 5% of the total population of Lebanon. Note that the following percentages are estimates only. However, in a country that had last census in 1932, it is difficult to have correct population estimates. 

Under the terms of an unwritten agreement known as the National Pact between the various political and religious leaders of Lebanon, the Melkite community in Lebanon has eight reserved seats in the Parliament of Lebanon.

Lebanese Melkite-born Notables
André Haddad
Najwa Karam
Marwan Fares
Majida El Roumi
John Elya
Peter IV Geraigiry
Saad Haddad
Marie Keyrouz
Wael Kfoury
Amin Maalouf
Henri Philippe Pharaoun
Michel Pharaon
Joseph Raya
Omar Sharif
Charbel Nahas
Jean Makaron
Nicolas Osta

See also
 Christianity in Lebanon
 Roman Catholicism in Lebanon
 Religion in Lebanon
 Lebanese Maronite Christians
 Lebanese Protestant Christians
 Lebanese Greek Orthodox Christians
 Lebanese Shia Muslims
 Lebanese Sunni Muslims
 Lebanese Druze

References